Margad Sar (also known as Marg Sar) is a village in Keshvar Rural District, Papi District, Khorramabad County, Lorestan Province, Iran. At the 2006 census, its population was 64, in 11 families.

References 

Towns and villages in Khorramabad County